Andrew Ingraham (New Bedford, MA, USA, 19 December 1841– Cambridge, MA, USA, 6 August 1905) was Headmaster of Swain School before 1903.

He is credited with the invention of the Gostak concept. He also edited various prefaces to standard literary texts.

References

External links
 
 

1841 births
1905 deaths
American school principals
American educators